Morris McDonald (August 1865 – May 20, 1938), was an American railroad executive.

McDonald was born in New Albany, Indiana. He began his railroad career with the Louisville, Evansville and St. Louis Railway in 1885. He later worked for the Central of Georgia Railway and was appointed General Superintendent of the Maine Central Railroad in 1897.

He was President of the Boston & Maine Railroad from 1913 to 1914. He resigned that position, and then served as President of the Maine Central until he retired in 1932.

McDonald died on May 20, 1938 in Portland, Maine.

See also
List of railroad executives

References

Boston and Maine Railroad
Maine Central Railroad
1865 births
1938 deaths
19th-century American railroad executives
20th-century American railroad executives
People from New Albany, Indiana